Nonesis Nek Pass, is situated in the Eastern Cape, province of South Africa, on the regional road R396, between  Queenstown, Eastern Cape and Lady Frere.

Mountain passes of the Eastern Cape